Shepperson is a surname. Notable people with the surname include:

Lisa Shepperson (born 1975), Republican member of the Wyoming House of Representatives, representing the 58th district since 2007
Sir Ernest Shepperson, 1st Baronet (1874–1949), Conservative Party politician in the United Kingdom
Alec Shepperson (born 1936), English amateur golfer
George "Sam" Shepperson, English Africanist and historian
Claude Allin Shepperson, (1867–1921) a British artist and illustrator
John D. Shepperson, (1851–1921) an American politician